"Famous First Words" is a song written by Byron Hill and JB Rudd, and recorded by Canadian country music artist Gil Grand. It was released as the debut single and title track from Grand's 1998 debut album. It peaked at number 6 on the Canadian RPM Country Tracks chart and number 73 on the U.S. Billboard Hot Country Singles & Tracks chart.

Music video 
The music video was directed by Michael Merriman and premiered in mid-1998.

Chart performance
The song debuted at number 78 on the Canadian RPM Country Tracks on the chart dated May 11, 1998 and spent 14 weeks on the chart before peaking at number 6 on August 10.

Weekly charts

Year-end charts

References

Gil Grand songs
1998 singles
Songs written by Byron Hill
Monument Records singles
Song recordings produced by Byron Hill